St Augustine's Abbey or Ramsgate Abbey is a former Benedictine abbey in Ramsgate. It  was built in 1860 by Augustus Pugin and is a Grade II listed building. It was the first Benedictine monastery to be built in England since the Reformation. In 2010, the monks moved to St Augustine's Abbey in Chilworth, Surrey. The site is now owned by the Vincentian Congregation from Kerala, India. The church of St Augustine, across the road from the abbey site, belongs to the Archdiocese of Southwark and is a shrine of St Augustine of Canterbury.

History
Augustus Pugin had built his home, The Grange, in Ramsgate, and St Augustine's Church next door. He donated the church to the Catholic Diocese of Southwark before his death in 1852, and The Grange remained in private hands.

In 1856, the Bishop of Southwark, Thomas Grant, invited the Subiaco Cassinese Congregation of the Benedictines to form a monastic community in Kent and take over the running of the church. The abbey was built across the road from the church and this was designed by Edward Pugin and Peter Paul Pugin.

The monastery became independent in 1876, a priory in 1881 and was raised to the status of an abbey by Pope Leo XIII in 1896. In 1865, a school was established by the monks which lasted until 1995.

In 1936, in nearby Minster-in-Thanet, a group of Benedictine nuns arrived and set up a priory on the remains of a 7th-century abbey and named it St Mildred's Abbey.

Departure of the Monks

On 15 October 2009, it was decided by the monks to relocate to a smaller property which would be easier to maintain. On 23 December 2010, they agreed to move to a former Franciscan friary in Chilworth, Surrey. When they moved in 2011, they named the friary St Augustine's Abbey maintaining continuity between the abbey in Ramsgate and their new home.

St Augustine's Church was returned to the care of the Archdiocese of Southwark. On 1 March 2012, the Archbishop of Southwark, Peter Smith established the church as a Shrine to St Augustine of Canterbury. On 20 May 2012, the church was inaugurated as a shrine at Solemn Vespers and a relic of St Augustine, donated by the Oxford Oratory, was placed in the church.

The abbey was sold by the monks to the Vincentian Congregation in 2014. It is now Divine Retreat Centre UK, and hosts charismatic Catholic retreats.

Gallery

See also
 The Grange, Ramsgate
 St Augustine's Abbey, Chilworth
 St Mildred's Abbey, Minster
 Subiaco Cassinese Congregation

References

External links

 Divine UK site
 Shrine of St Augustine site
 Ramsgate and Minster Parish site
 Chilworth Abbey site

Monasteries in Kent
Benedictine monasteries in England
Grade II listed buildings in Kent
1852 establishments in England
Roman Catholic churches in Kent
Gothic Revival church buildings in England
Roman Catholic churches completed in 1852
Gothic Revival architecture in Kent
Grade II listed Roman Catholic churches in England
19th-century Roman Catholic church buildings in the United Kingdom